Christmas is a 1991 album by American singer-songwriter Don McLean.  The album was released on the Curb Records label.

Track listing 
 "Winter Wonderland" (Felix Bernard, Dick Smith)
 "O Little Town of Bethlehem" (Phillips Brooks, Lewis H. Redner)
 "Santa Claus Is Coming to Town" (J. Fred Coots, Haven Gillespie)
 "I'll Be Home for Christmas/Have Yourself a Merry Little Christmas" (Ralph Blane, Kim Gannon, Walter Kent, Hugh Martin, Buck Ram)
 "Go Tell It on the Mountain" (Traditional, John Wesley Work II)
 "Burgundian Carol" (Oscar Brand)
 "White Christmas" (Irving Berlin)
 "God Rest Ye Merry Gentlemen" (Traditional)
 "Pretty Paper" (Willie Nelson)
 "'Twas the Night Before Christmas"

Personnel 
 Don McLean – vocals, arrangements
 Brent Mason – electric guitar
 Biff Watson – acoustic guitar
 Robert Thomas Wray – bass
 Tommy Wells – drums
 Tony Migliore – keyboards, string arrangements
 The Jordanaires – background vocals

References 

Don McLean albums
Christmas albums by American artists
1991 Christmas albums
Curb Records albums
Rock Christmas albums